This list of gourds and squashes provides an alphabetical list of (mostly edible) varieties (cultivars) of the plant genus Cucurbita, commonly called gourds, squashes, pumpkins and zucchinis/courgettes. Common names can differ by location. The varieties included below are members of the following species:

 C. argyrosperma
 C. ficifolia
 C. maxima
 C. moschata
 C. pepo

The entries below are predominantly based on the SysTax database. Not all have the 'accepted' status in the ITIS database.

C. argyrosperma 

 Cushaw squash

C. ficifolia 

 Fig-leaf squash

C. maxima 

 Amphora
 Aurantiaca-Alba
 Atlantic Giant
 Australian Butter
 Big Moon
 
 Blue Banana
 Buttercup squash
 Crown Prince
 Flat White Boer A
 
 
 Giraumon Turban
 Golden Delicious
 Golias
 Green Hubbard
 
 
 Hubbard squash
 Kiszombori
 Kabocha
 Mammut
 
 
 
 
 
 Prizewinner
 Queensland Blue
 Red kuri squash (Hokkaido)
 
 Sweet meat
 
  
 Trombone
 Turban squash
 Valenciano
 Veltruska
 Viridi-Alba
 
 Yellow Hubbard

C. moschata

 Butternut squash
 Calabaza
 Dickinson pumpkin
 Futsu black-rinded 
 Long Island cheese pumpkin
 
 
 
 Shishigatani

C. pepo 

 Acorn squash
 Ampullaris
 Aurantia
 Baby Boo
 Big Max pumpkin
 Black Zucchini
 
 Bunter Patisson
 Caserta
 Casertaosa
 Casertara
 Casertarmis
 Citrullina
 Cocozelle
 
 Connecticut field pumpkin
 
 Custard White
 Delicata squash
 Early prolific Straightneck
 Ex 
  Oblonga
  Pyriformis
 Gem squash
 Gemini F1
 
 Giromontina
 Gold Rush F1
 Indian Summer Mix
 Jack be Little
 
 
 
 
 Lebanese
 Maliformis
 Mandarin
  Comet
  Reform
 Patidou
 Patisson
 Pattypan squash
 
 Pyriformis
 Pyxidaris
 
 Reticulata
 Romanesco
 
 
 Spaghetti squash
 Styrian oil pumpkin
 Tatuma (Tatume) (White Mexican squash)
 Tschermak
 Verrucosa
 Verrucosissima 
 Verte d´Italia
 Wendehals
 White Custard
 Winterhorn
 Yellow summer squash
 Zucchini

See also
 List of squash and pumpkin dishes

References

External links

Gourds And Squashes